James Fowler Simmons (September 10, 1795July 10, 1864) was a businessman and politician from Rhode Island who twice served as a United States senator, first as a Whig and then as a Republican.

He is notable for having the Senate consider expelling him for corruption during his second term as a Senator.

Early life
Born on a farm near Little Compton, he attended a private school in Newport and moved to Providence in 1812. He was employed in various manufacturing concerns in Rhode Island and Massachusetts and engaged in the manufacture of yarn at Simmonsville (now Thornton), a village still existing in Johnston, RI, in 1822.

He moved to Johnston, Rhode Island in 1827 and resumed the manufacture of yarns and engaged in agricultural pursuits; he was a member of the Rhode Island House of Representatives from 1828 to 1841.  His house still stands on Atwood Avenue.

United States senator 
Simmons was elected as a Whig to the U.S. Senate and served from March 4, 1841, to March 3, 1847.

While in the Senate, he was chairman of the Committee on Manufactures (Twenty-seventh and Twenty-eighth Congresses) and a member of the Committee on Printing (Twenty-seventh and Twenty-eighth Congresses).

Post-Senate career
After running unsuccessfully for reelection in 1846, Simmons returned to Johnston and resumed his former pursuits.  He was an unsuccessful candidate for the Senate in 1850.

Return to the U.S. Senate
Simmons was again elected to the United States Senate in 1856 as a Republican and served from March 4, 1857, through the first year of the American Civil War. He was chairman of the Committee on Patents and the Patent Office during the Thirty-seventh Congress.

On July 12, 1862, Senator Joseph A. Wright of Indiana submitted a resolution calling for Simmons's expulsion. Wright stated that Secretary of War Edwin Stanton accused Simmons of securing a contract for two Rhode Island rifle manufacturers in exchange for a fee of $20,000 in promissory notes.

Following these accusations, Congress passed a law barring members of Congress from accepting fees for services before agencies of the United States government. On July 14, the Senate Judiciary Committee issued a report stating that it found Simmons' conduct "entirely inexcusable" but that charging Simmons would be an ex post facto violation of his rights, in that his conduct had occurred before the law prohibiting it was passed. The Committee recommended that the Senate do what it felt necessary. The Senate adjourned three days later, having taken no action in Simmons' case.

Simmons resigned on September 5, 1862, before the Senate could return for its December session and again take up the question of expelling him.

Later life
After his resignation, Simmons resumed his former manufacturing pursuits.

Death and burial
Simmons died in Johnston in 1864.  He was buried at North End Cemetery in Providence.

See also
List of federal political scandals in the United States
List of United States senators expelled or censured

References

External links

|-

1795 births
1864 deaths
19th-century American politicians
Burials at North Burying Ground (Providence)
Members of the Rhode Island House of Representatives
People from Little Compton, Rhode Island
People of Rhode Island in the American Civil War
Republican Party United States senators from Rhode Island
Rhode Island politicians convicted of crimes
Rhode Island Republicans
Rhode Island Whigs
Whig Party United States senators